Union Sportive de Boulogne-sur-Mer Côte d'Opale (commonly referred to as US Boulogne or frequently, simply Boulogne) is a French association football club based in the commune of Boulogne-sur-Mer. The club was founded in 1898 and currently plays in Championnat National 2, the fourth level of French football, having been relegated from the Championnat National at the end of the 2021–22 season.

The club was formed in 1898 and its achievements are comparatively minor, with their biggest feat to date consisting of reaching the semi-finals during the 1936–37 edition of the Coupe de France. Boulogne play their home matches at the Stade de la Libération, which seats 15,004 having previously seated only 7,000 prior to its renovation in 2007.

History 
US Boulogne were originally founded in December 1898 by a group of young local athletes. While they mainly focused originally on athletic events, they created a football team to provide themselves with sporting competition in the winter months, and made a decent job in their first few years as a football club. Boulogne won the Maritime Championship three years running between 1904 and 1906. They next won the Championship in 1909 and their final victory of this division was in 1922. In 1924, Boulogne moved to the Northern Championship and fared well. The team also did well in the Coupe de France – reaching the quarter-finals in 1929 and the last 16 three times.

In 1926, Boulogne won the Northern League and only six years later, they decided to become a professional club. In 1935, under chairman Marcel Lacroix, the team joined the professional leagues. However, they played averagely in Division Two but there were a few bright sparks in the team. The Coupe de France 1937 competition saw Boulogne reach the semi-finals, but they were convincingly beaten by FC Sochaux 6–0. After the war, Boulogne, reverted to amateur status – and only decided to become a professional team again in 1957, when they were re-elected into Division Two. They stayed comfortably in Division Two for 22 years but then plummeted through the divisions – suffering consecutive relegations. The Coupe de France competition only provided little respite, as the team made the last 16 three times.

Robert Senechal arrived in 1983 and stabilised the club in Division Four. They missed out on promotion by a narrow margin in 1984 – but were finally promoted in 1991. However, it was short-lived and they were relegated the following season. In June 1994, it was announced that Boulogne were in serious debt – owing  ₣3 million. However, mayor of Boulougne and billionaire John Muselet intervened to save the club and appointed Jacques Wattez as chairman. Under the leadership of Wattez, the club adopted a new official name – Union Sportive Boulogne Côte d'Opale – in July 1994. as a new company, the debts of the club were wiped and Boulogne – although still struggling in Division Four – reached the last sixteen of the Coupe de France again in 1997. They earned a home tie against Ligue 1 side Olympique de Marseille. Although Boulogne battled bravely through the match, they narrowly lost to their illustrious opponents 0–1.

Boulogne were slowly building their team in the Championnat National and under manager Philippe Montanier, the club clinched promotion to Ligue 2 with a tense 2–1 victory over SC Toulon. However, Boulogne were initially blocked from playing in Ligue 2 due to financial problems but after hard work, they were given the green light to play in that league for the 2007–08 season. They struggled that season and on the final day, they were occupying the final relegation spot, one point from safety. Boulogne played at home to Chamois Niortais FC, who were one place above Boulogne. A tense game saw Boulogne win the match in the 95th minute through defender Damien Perrinelle and it kept Boulogne up whilst sending Niort down to the Championnat National.

The 2008–09 season saw Boulogne do the opposite from last season and win promotion on the final day of the season after beating SC Amiens 4–0, replacing Strasbourg in the final promotion place by a single point. Striker Grégory Thil finished top scorer with 18 goals as the side made their first-ever appearance in the Ligue 1. They stayed just one season, being relegated in 2010. Two seasons later they suffered a further relegation back to Championnat National.

In March 2020, Boulogne were third in Championnat National when the season was prematurely ended due to the COVID-19 pandemic. They were denied an opportunity for promotion when the FFF executive committee announced that the usual playoff between 18th in Ligue 2 and 3rd in Championnat National would not go ahead.

The team finished bottom of the 2021–22 Championnat National table, and were relegated to Championnat National 2 after 17 years in the top three divisions.

Players

Current squad

Staff

 Head coach :  Christophe Raymond
 Assistant coach :  Cédric Blomme
 Goalkeeping coach :  Hugo Stevenart
 Fitness Trainer:  Antoine Decaix

Notable players 
Below are the notable players who have represented Boulogne in league and international competition since the club's foundation in 1919.

  Franck Ribéry
  Lucien Leduc
  Daniel Moreira
  Yves Triantafyllos
  Diafra Sakho
  Ovidy Karuru
  N'Golo Kanté
  Loïc Damour

Managers

References

External links 

 

 
Association football clubs established in 1898
1898 establishments in France
Boulogne-sur-Mer
Sport in Pas-de-Calais
Football clubs in France
Football clubs in Hauts-de-France
Ligue 1 clubs